The Shenandoah River is a river in New Zealand's West Coast Region. It flows northwest to reach the Maruia River 25 kilometres southeast of Inangahua.

See also
List of rivers of New Zealand

References

Rivers of the West Coast, New Zealand
Buller District
Rivers of New Zealand